Caloptilia pentaplaca is a moth of the family Gracillariidae. It is known from Namibia, Nigeria, the Seychelles and South Africa.

References

pentaplaca
Insects of West Africa
Moths of Africa
Insects of Namibia
Fauna of Seychelles
Moths described in 1911